, formerly , is a former member of the Japanese imperial family. She is the eldest child of Crown Prince Fumihito and Crown Princess Kiko, niece of Emperor Naruhito, and granddaughter of Emperor Emeritus Akihito and Empress Emerita Michiko. After marrying outside the imperial family in October 2021, she gave up her title as required by the Imperial Household Law.

Early life and education

Mako Komuro was born Princess Mako of Akishino on 23 October 1991 to Fumihito, Prince Akishino, and Kiko, Princess Akishino, at Imperial Household Agency Hospital in Tokyo Imperial Palace, Chiyoda, Tokyo. She has a younger sister, Princess Kako, and a younger brother, Prince Hisahito. Mako was educated at the Gakushūin School in her Primary, Girls' Junior and Senior High School years. She studied English at University College, Dublin (UCD), in July–August 2010. She had an informal talk with the President of Ireland, Mary McAleese, and she visited Northern Ireland.

The Princess graduated from the International Christian University in Mitaka, Tokyo, on 26 March 2014 with a bachelor's degree in Art and Cultural Heritage. She obtained Japanese national certification in curation as well as a driver's license while she was an undergraduate student. She later studied art history at the University of Edinburgh for nine months, from September 2012 to May 2013. On 17 September 2014, she left for the United Kingdom where she studied at the University of Leicester for a year, receiving an MA degree in Art Museum and Gallery Studies on 21 January 2016. In September 2016, she enrolled in the doctoral course of the Graduate School of Arts and Sciences, International Christian University.

Public life

Mako has been considered by some to be an internet idol since 2004, when images of her in sailor fuku appeared on television. An image repository was set up, and a video featuring fanart of Komuro was uploaded onto the popular video-sharing website Nico Nico Douga, attracting over 340,000 views and 86,000 comments. The Imperial Household Agency, responding to a request for comment, stated that they are not sure how they should handle this phenomenon, since they see no signs of slander or insults against the Imperial Family.

In 2011, Princess Mako came of age and was conferred Grand Cordon of the Order of the Precious Crown on 23 October. Since then, she began attending official events as an adult member of the Imperial Family. She gave her patronage to a number of organizations, including the Japan Tennis Association and the Japan Kōgei Association.

In October 2021, she formally lost her title upon marriage as required by Imperial Household Law.

Official visits

 December 2015 – El Salvador and Honduras 
 September 2016 – Paraguay
 June 2017 – Bhutan
 August 2017 – Hungary
 July 2018 – Brazil
 July 2019 – Peru and Bolivia

Personal interests
In August 2006, Mako visited Vienna, Austria for two weeks on a school-sponsored homestay program. She stayed in the home of an Austrian citizen who was a colleague of Tatsuhiko Kawashima, her maternal grandfather. Because Mako is interested in art and architecture, she visited the museums, St. Stephen's Cathedral and Schönbrunn Palace.

In July 2011, she worked as a volunteer in the affected areas of the 2011 Tōhoku earthquake and tsunami without revealing her identity.

She became a project researcher at The University Museum, The University of Tokyo on 1 April 2016.

In April 2022, it was reported that she was working as an unpaid volunteer at the Metropolitan Museum of Art, assisting curators within the museum's Asian art collection.

Marriage

In May 2017, it was announced that the Princess was expected to marry Kei Komuro. The two had met while both students at International Christian University (ICU), and he had proposed to her in December 2013.

The wedding was originally expected to take place in November 2018, but it was postponed after media reports of Komuro's mother's financial dispute with her former fiance over ¥4 million ($36,000). Some of the money had been used to pay Komuro's tuition fees, and the dispute resulted in the public's disapproval of the match. Komuro stated that his mother initially believed the money was a gift and added that he wished to pay it back. Princess Mako blamed the postponement on the couple's immaturity at that time.

On 26 October 2021, Princess Mako officially married Komuro following the submission of their marriage document at the local ward office. Like her paternal aunt, Sayako, Princess Nori, and other princesses who married commoners in recent decades she formally lost her title and became a commoner upon marriage as required by Imperial Household Law. In light of the scandals surrounding her husband's family, she also refused the Japanese government's taxpayer funded payment of ¥140 million ($1.3 million USD) given to royal women upon leaving the Imperial Family. She is the first female member of the imperial family to forgo an official wedding ceremony and a gift of money from the government.

While awaiting her passport issuance and US Visa, Mako moved to her own residence in the Shibuya district in Tokyo as she is by law not allowed to live at her parents' house inside the imperial quarters. Kei resolved the financial dispute between his mother and her ex-fiancé in November 2021, paying the ex-fiancé an undisclosed sum of money to resolve the debt. The couple departed for New York in mid-November 2021.

Kei Komuru began studying at Fordham University School of Law in August 2018 and graduated with a Juris Doctor in May 2021. He later joined Lowenstein Sandler, a law firm in New York as a law clerk. He passed New York's bar exam in October 2022 and began working as a lawyer in 2023.

Health
Weeks before her planned wedding, the Imperial Household Agency announced on behalf of Princess Mako that she had recently been diagnosed with complex post-traumatic stress disorder (C-PTSD) by the head of the quality assurance room of the NTT Tokyo Medical Center. The diagnosis determined that the C-PTSD originated during her primary high school years and continued due to strong criticism from imperial family members and the media.

Titles, styles, and honours

Titles and styles
Mako was styled as Her Imperial Highness Princess Mako until her marriage on 26 October 2021, after which she became known as Mrs. Kei Komuro.

Honours

National honours
:  Grand Cordon of the Order of the Precious Crown (23 October 2011)

Foreign honours
:  Grand Cross of the Order of Rio Branco (12 October 2021)
:   Grand Cross of the National Order of Merit (5 October 2021)

References

External links

Their Imperial Highnesses Crown Prince and Crown Princess Akishino and their family at the Imperial Household Agency website

Japanese princesses
1991 births
Living people
People from Tokyo

Grand Cordons (Imperial Family) of the Order of the Precious Crown

International Christian University alumni
Alumni of the University of Leicester
Alumni of the University of Edinburgh
People with post-traumatic stress disorder
Controversies in Japan
Japanese expatriates in the United States